Justice Chowdary is a 1982 Indian Telugu-language action drama film, produced by T. Trivikrama Rao and directed by K. Raghavendra Rao. It stars N. T. Rama Rao and Sridevi, with music composed by Chakravarthy. The film was remade in Hindi as Justice Chaudhury, in Tamil as Neethibathi and in Malayalam as Justice Raja. The film became a box office hit and the second highest grossing Telugu film of the year 1982 after Rama Rao's own Bobbili Puli.

Plot 
Advocate R. K. Chowdary a disciple of justice, once prosecutes a murder case done by Ranga Rao, the twin brother of a dangerous gangster Papa Rao and the case is defended by Chowdary's opponent Kailasam. Here Chowdary wins the case and sentences Ranga Rao to death, there onwards, Papa Rao swore to avenge on Chowdary when Kailasam also joins him and they hang to repay. Chowdary leads a happy family life with his ideal wife Janaki, son Inspector Raja, daughter-in-law Latha, and daughter Lakshmi, who is mute. Parallelly, Ramu a young and energetic guy, resembles Chowdary is a motor mechanic and a racer and he loves Kailasam's daughter Rekha. Recognizing his calibre Papa Rao and Kailasam misuse him for their criminal activities which he too accepts to fulfill his life ambition of constructing a house for his mother Radha who is under prison for the crime he committed. Meanwhile, Chowdary becomes High Court Chief Justice which evildoers couldn't abide, so, they frame a plan, performs the Lakshmi's marriage with their acolyte Gopal to exploit Chowdary but he stands strong even Gopal necks out Lakshmi. At the same time, Kailasam discovers Ramu as Justice Chowdary's son, so, they again intrigue by creating Chowdary as a deceiver of his mother and provokes Ramu against Chowdary to take revenge. Now Ramu indicts Raja in a crime by changing his attire as Chowdary and in the court, Chowdary compelled to sentence life imprisonment to him. Thereafter, Chowdary starts digging the matter when he finds out Radha is alive and Ramu is his son. Then he recalls the past, Chowdary and Radha are love birds in the college and just before their marriage, Radha misplaces. Later he ascertains herself as dead. Hence on the advice of his maternal uncle, he reconciles with life and married Janaki. At present, Chowdary decides to affirm the truth but due to Janaki's health condition, he holds back. In the meantime, Radha releases, Chowdary meets her, learns that she has intentionally discarded from his life being aware of Janaki's love through his maternal uncle when Chowdary understands her virtue and also divulges Ramu's credulity. At that point of in time, evil-minded Papa Rao seizes Chowdary's family even Kailasam also double-crossed by him. Here Chowdary gamely breaks out his play, simultaneously, knowing the reality Ramu realises his mistake and moves for his father's aid. At last, both of them see the end of Papa Rao when Radha sacrifices her life to save Chowdary. Finally, the movie ends a happy note with the marriage of Ramu and Rekha.

Cast 

Sr. N.T.R.  as Justice R. K. Chowdary and Ramu (Dual Role)
Sridevi as Rekha
Sharada as Radha
Jayanthi as Janaki
Rao Gopal Rao as Lawyer Kailasam
Satyanarayana as Papa Rao and Ranga Rao (Dual Role)
Allu Ramalingaiah as Tata Rao
Nagesh as Anthony
Prabhakar Reddy as Dr. Murthy
Mukkamala as Chowdary's father-in-law
Chalapathi Rao as Chalapathi
P. J. Sarma as Commissioner
Sridhar as Inspector Raja
Raja as Gopal
Telephone Satyanarayana as Judge
Hema Sundar as Jaganatham
Rajya Lakshmi as Latha
Mucherla Aruna as Lakshmi
Subhashini as Tata Rao's daughter

Soundtrack 

Music composed by Chakravarthy. Lyrics were written by Veturi. Music released on AVM Audio Company.

Reception 
Venkat Rao of Andhra Patrika in his review dated 31 May 1982, wrote that the film is a testimony to Rama Rao's acting prowess. On 13 June 1982, Palakodeti of Sitara also echoed the same, praising Rama Rao's performance.

Modern adaptations 
N.T. Rama Rao's grandson  Jr. N.T.R. had briefly mimicked his grandfather's voice, played the character, and parodied Justice Chowdhary's character in the 2013 film Baadshah for a comedy scene with Brahmanandam Kanneganti.

References

External links 

1980s action drama films
1980s Telugu-language films
Films directed by K. Raghavendra Rao
Films scored by K. Chakravarthy
Indian action drama films
Indian courtroom films
Indian legal films
Telugu films remade in other languages